BluRum13 (alternate spellings include Blu Rum 13, BluRum 13, and Blurum 13), born James Sobers, is an American underground rapper, emcee, actor and producer who also uses the pseudonym Killa Platypus. Originally from New York City, he spent most of his formative years in Washington, D.C. and is the great nephew of knighted cricketer Sir Garfield Sobers.

Career

Solo projects
BluRum13’s first album The Previouslee Unreleased Recordings of BluRum13 (not on a label) was the catalyst for subsequent collaborations with London-based DJ Vadim, who included the song It’s Obvious on his 2002 release U.S.S.R. Life From the Other Side (Ninjatune, 1990). BluRum toured as the live emcee for Vadim’s group The Russian Percussion (also featuring beatboxer Killa Kela, DJ Mr Thing and DJ Woody), which was created to promote the album. BluRum’s second album Vaguely Familiar was released on DJ Vadim’s label Jazz Fudge, along with singles Sleep Speechless and Figure it Out.

In 2007, BluRum self-released the EP Tether with UK beat boxer Koobs.

In 2013, after multiple collaborations with various artists and bands, BluRum released an online full-length album entitled Inverted.

In 2017, BluRum released Rainbows, Butterflies & Gangstas produced by Australian DJ/Producer and BBE label mate Inkswel (Beatgeeks Records).

In December 2018, BluRum13 released the inaugural track for Galant Records (sister label to Jarring Effects) digital series SEEDS with the single "Trying to Live" featuring the production of Lyon-based producer RXX/R33.

Bands and collectives
BluRum13 is well known for his work with various bands, producers and collectives in North America, Europe, and Australia. He was part of Montreal-based funk band Bullfrog (featuring Kid Koala) from 1994 to 2004 (Atlantic/Rope-a-Dope Records). In 2005 Vadim and BluRum formed the hip hop group One Self with MC Yarah Bravo, releasing the album Children of Possibility on Ninja Tune, and collaborating with Fat Freddy’s Drop, and Reggie Watts. The group were described by The Times as "best newcomers of 2005" and won Channel 4's Slashmusic Showcase. BluRum was a member of London-based collective True Ingredients and Maryland-based collective Water Power.

BluRum has also collaborated with a number of producers including Luke Vibert with whom he released two albums. The first entitled Smell the Urgency was self-released online in 2004 then re-released on vinyl by France's Besides Records in 2017, while their second full-length album as Bluke entitled "Sense the Urgency" was released in 2019 on double-vinyl by Ropeadope Records.
BluRum has been a featured emcee and live front-man for a number of other groups, including US3, Reverse Engineering, Resin Dogs, Aquasky, and many more.

In 2012, BluRum13 released a joint project with Manchester artist Matt Brewer, a.k.a. Frameworks, entitled "The Brickbuilders EP." That same year, BluRum13 began a live show collaboration with acclaimed Spanish jazz drummer Mark Ayza, and also founded the dub-hop/electro step group Indigenous Invaders with DJ Toner (Granada). Indigenous Invaders appeared live at the world’s first YouTube music festival in Madrid on September 28, 2012. The band released a single titled "As long as I C" on Jarring Effects label, and in 2014 they released a digital EP titled "Above and Below" on SoundCloud. Indigenous Invaders performed at numerous festivals sharing stage with artists such as Dope D.O.D. and DJ Woody.

In 2017, BluRum13 reunited with former Russian Percussion tour mate DJ Woody and his close collaborator DJ Boca as "BocaWoody," appearing on five songs on their debut Carousel LP and accompanying 7" vinyl.

Film
In 2016, James Sobers (a.k.a. BluRum13) played a supporting role as cowboy outlaw “Randy” in the cast of western feature film ‘’’The Price of Death’’’ by Chip Baker, shot in Almeria, Spain.

Discography

BluRum13 releases
 Trying to Live digital release, Galant Records, France 2018
 Smell the Urgency BLUKE with Luke Vibert, Besides Records, France 2017
 Rainbows, Butterflies & Gangstas (12") with Inkswel, MP3 BeatGeeks Records, Germany 2017
 BluConnspiracy Online release 2015
 Inverted (LP) Online release 2013
 The Brickbuilders EP with Frameworks (EP) My First Moth 2012
 Tell Me You Love It (EP) (2 versions) 777 Records 2008
 The Hip Hop EP (12") 777 Records 2008
 Choose To Care (12") The Elephant 2006
 Do It (4 What?) / Be 1 Too / Odds Even (12") Analogic Recordings 2005
 Earthbound / Futuristic B-Boys (12") The Elephant 2005
 "Did You?" Jazz Fudge 2003
 Figure It Out / It Is (12") Jazz Fudge 2001
 Vaguely Familiar (3 versions) Jazz Fudge 2001
 Sleep Speechless / On Course (12") Jazz Fudge 2000

Bullfrog
 Bullfrog / Robertson - Deeper Shade of Green (Independent) 2004
 Bullfrog - s/t (Ropeadope Records) 2001

One Self
 Organically Grown EP (November 2006)
 Be Your Own w/Amp Fiddler remix 12” and Ltd Edition (Ninja Tune, April 2005)
 The Blue Bird/Fear The Labour 12” (Ninja Tune, May 2005)
 Children Of Possibility LP (Ninja Tune, June 2005) with Yarah Bravo and BluRum13.
 Paranoid/Over Expose/Come Along 12” (Ninja Tune, September 2005)

True Ingredients
Who's Next single (2010)
Prepare & Assemble album (2008)
All Out single (2005)

Featured On
 Chaos Woxow Alcazar Little Beat More, 2018 
 Carousel LP BocaWoody (DJ Boca, DJ Woody) 2017
 Jump (Single) 7" vinyl BocaWoody 2017
 Flip the Scripture The Allergies As We Do Our Thing (LP, Full-length album) Jalapeno Records, 2016
 Lost In A Vortex Berlin Eggsile (CD, Album, Jak) Jarring Effects 2010
 Stormy Minds Figure One (A JFX Studio Session) (12", White Album) Jarring Effects 2010
 Defiance Future Shock Highly Complex Machinery (CD, Album, Dig) Jarring Effects 2010
 Alignment Battlefield (2xLP, Album) Jarring Effects 2008
 Alignment French Dub System 2008 (CD, Comp) Wagram 2008
 Choose To Care Targets (Album) (2 versions) Discograph 2008
 Channels Just Banks Under The Influence (CD, Enh) Etage Noir Recordings 2008
 There Are Things... Closed (2xCD, Album) All Soundz 2007
 Choose To Care DJ Netik - Champion Sounds (CD, Mixed) DMC 2007
 DTTR (12") (Total Terror mix) Jarring Effects 2007
 End Game Resin Dogs More (CD, Album, Dig) Hydrofunk Records 2007
 The Soundcatcher Extras (Album) (2 versions) Quand Vient La Nuit BBE 2007
 Invisible Soldiers Olven Миледи (CD, Album) True-Melody 2007
 A Hundred Days In One (2 versions) Rest Assured Catskills Records 2006
 Cay's Crays (Single) (3 versions)
 Cay's Crays (One Self) Kartel Creative 2006
 Duck And Cover (CD, Album) Tug O War, Soundsystem, Jarring Effects 2006
 Ghost Forest (CD, Album) No Fridge 2006
 Temptation Jstar UK Dubs Remixes Vol. 1 (12") Jstar 2006
 Liquid Surfaces Re-Processed #1 (2 versions) Jarring Effects 2006
 Między Nami Cafe 4 (CD, Comp, Mixed, Dig) "Be Your Own" (Amp Fiddler)
Audiopharm 2005
 Nutrition Facts (CD, Album) Dramenbejsky Gig Ant 2005
 Mash Up (2 versions) "Choose To Care" (Main) Discograph 2005
 Reverse Engineering Feat. BluRum13 (LP) Jarring Effects 2005
 U.S.S.R. The Art Of Listening (Album) (2 versions) "Till Suns In Your Eyes"
Ninja Tune 2002
 U.S.S.R. Life From The Other Side (Album) (5 versions) 2002
 Bullfrog EP 2 (CD, Mini) Rope-a-Dope/Atlantic Records 2000
 It's Obvious (Single) (2 versions) Ninja Tune 1999

Tracks Appear On
 Love to Hate War (Dusty Remix) Various - Electro Swing Fever (4xCD, Comp + Box) Wagram 2010
 Stormy Minds Various - Audioactivism #2 (CD, Comp) Jarring Effects 2010
 Tell Me You Love It Break Beat Bass Vol 4 (CD, Mixed by Aquasky) Passenger 2008
 Soundsystem Various - Métissages Vol. 1 (CD, Comp) V2 Music France 2006
 Choose to Care Various - Scopitone Nantes/Rezé (CD, Comp, Dig) Olympic (3) 2006
 Talking Green Dope Beats Vol. 1 - Jusqu'Ici Tout Va Bien (CD, Comp, Dig) Supadope Records 2005
 Did You DJ Vadim - Stereo Pictures Vol. 03 (CD, Mixed, Promo, Album) MK2 Music 2003
 Letter Twenty Five Juice CD Volume 21 (CD, Comp) Juice Magazine 2002
 It Is MPM (Mikirov Per Minute) (Cass) 2002
 It Is Spotlight Records (3) 2002
 We Might Be You Up North Trip, (CD, Comp, Promo) Under Pressure Magazine 2002
  It's Obvious #20 (Cass, Comp, Mixed) Not On Label (DJ Kojak Self-released) 2000

Unofficial releases

 Def Beat Remixes Vol. 3 (2xLP, Comp, Unofficial) 2005

References

External links
 BluRum13 official website
 Indigenous Invaders official website
 BluRum13 Discogs

1974 births
Living people
African-American rappers
21st-century American rappers
21st-century African-American musicians
20th-century African-American people